Evan Evans (20 April 1795 – 21 January 1855), was a Welsh clergyman, poet, hymnwriter, journalist, translator and devotional writer, who was three times chaired at the National Eisteddfod.  His works were almost all written in the Welsh language, the poems being published under his bardic name, Ieuan Glan Geirionydd.  Seven of his poems are included in The Oxford Book of Welsh Verse.  His best-known poems are perhaps Ysgoldy Rhad Llanrwst, Glan Geirionydd and Cyflafan Morfa Rhuddlan, and his hymns include Rwy'n sefyll ar dymhestlog lan and Mae 'nghyfeillion adre'n myned.

Youth 

Evan Evans was born at Tan-y-Celyn, a farmhouse near the village of Trefriw, Caernarfonshire.  His parents were educated people, and indeed his father was a poet; they were among the first Calvinist Methodists in their village.  Young Evan received his education at the village church school, then at the free grammar school in Llanrwst.  He then began working on his parents' farm, but the family fell into poverty when their landlord raised the rent.  In 1816 Evan, though he had never had any higher education, was taken on as schoolmaster at a day-school in Tal-y-Bont.  Moving to Chester he became an elder of the Methodist Church, though not yet 26 years of age.  Around this time he published several books on theological subjects, some original and some translations into Welsh, but they have today no great reputation.

Clerical career 

Evans' first successes as a poet now brought him to the notice of various gentlemen and clergymen, who suggested he seek ordination in the Church of England.  He trained for the priesthood at Berriew in Montgomeryshire and at St Bees Theological College in Cumberland, and was ordained in 1826.  The same year he was licensed to conduct Welsh-language services at St Martin's, Chester, and made curate of Christleton, near Chester.  In 1843 he was transferred to the curacy of Ince, in Cheshire.    In 1852 his wife, of whom little is known, died, and since Evans himself was in poor health he returned home to Trefriw.  In July 1854 he was given a curacy in Rhyl, and the following January he died there.  He was buried in Trefriw, alongside his parents and his wife.

Journalism 

For some years in his youth Evans devoted much of his time to Welsh-language journalism.  From 1818 to 1820, when he stepped down for health reasons, he was editor of the monthly magazine Goleuad Gwynedd.  In 1833 he became editor of Y Gwladgarwr, a magazine set up in imitation of the English Saturday Magazine, and continued in that job for three years.  Long after Evans' death it was remembered as being "far and away the most interesting of the earlier Welsh periodicals", and "one of the best magazines ever published in Welsh".

Poetry 

Evans is today chiefly known neither as a journalist nor as a clergyman but as a poet. His poems have in common a Stoical viewpoint and a smooth, musical, dignified style marked by clarity of language. Nevertheless, his oeuvre as a whole shows a versatility unmatched by any other 19th-century Welsh poet. He employed both the strict, classical Welsh metres and the free metres, and also excelled as a hymnwriter.  

His poems in the strict metres vary widely in quality.  Some, such as his Belshazzar's Feast, are disfigured by an archaism of vocabulary and spelling which betray the influence of William Owen Pughe and are now seldom read.  Others, like his  Y Bedd ("The Grave") (1821), notable for its metrical ease, are counted among the finest strict-metre poems of their time.

Most of the poems for which he is now remembered are lyrics written in the free metres.  Their themes include Welsh history, as in Cyflafan Morfa Rhuddlan ("The Massacre of Rhuddlan Marsh"), memories of his own childhood, as in Glan Geirionydd ("The Bank of Geirionydd") and Ysgoldy Rhad Llanrwst ("The Free School of Llanrwst"), and praise of mountain scenery, as in Glan Geirionydd again and Rhieingerdd Bugail Cwmdyli ("The Love Song of the Shepherd of Cwm Dyli").  Many of them are influenced by the works of the 18th-century English Graveyard School.

Evans' best hymns are considered to be among the greatest in the Welsh language; they are sung, it has been said, wherever the Welsh language is spoken.  The words employ a polished style reminiscent of Isaac Watts; they are in some cases original and in others translations from the English.  The melodies were in some cases Evans' work also, albeit harmonised by others.

Works

Poems 

   [With Robert Thomas of Llidiardau].
 
   [With William Williams (Caledfryn)].

Hymns and songs

Prose 

 
   [A translation of John Hurrion's The Scripture Doctrine of Particular Redemption].
 
   [Translation, ostensibly by  but actually by Evan Evans, of Thomas Boston's Human Nature in Its Fourfold State].
   [Translation of Narrative of conversations held with Christopher Davis and William Clarke, attributed to Sir James Alan Park].
 
   [In three volumes, edited by Evans].

Collected works 

Selections 

  [Edited by Sir Owen Morgan Edwards]
  [Edited by Saunders Lewis].

Translations 

English translations, complete and incomplete, of Evans' Welsh-language poems and hymns:

 Angau yn Ymyl:
 

 Ar làn Iorddonen ddofn
 

 At un a wrendy weddi'r gwán
 

 Beati Mortui:
 

 Y Bedd:
 

 Caniad y Gog i Arfon:
 

 Croesi'r Iordonen:
 

 Cydmariaeth rhwng y byd a’r Môr:
  [misattributed here to John Blackwell]

 Cyflafan Morfa Rhuddlan:
 
 
 
 

 Glan Geirionydd:
 

 Glan yr Iorddonen:
 

 Hen Forgan a’i Wraig:
 

 Mae ’nghyfeillion adre’n myned:
 
 

 Na Wrthod Fi:
 

 Yr Ochor Draw:
 

 O Dduw, rho im' dy hedd
 

 Rhieingerdd Bugail Cwmdyli:
 
 

 Rwy’n sefyll ar dymhestlog lan yr hen Iorddonen ddu:
 
 

 Ysgoldy Rhad Llanrwst:

Footnotes

References

External links 

1795 births
1855 deaths
Calvinistic Methodists
19th-century Welsh Anglican priests
Church in Wales hymnwriters
English–Welsh translators
People from Conwy County Borough
Welsh-language poets
Welsh magazine editors
Welsh Methodists